Jefferson Township is one of fourteen townships in Miami County, Indiana, United States. As of the 2010 census, its population was 2,412 and it contained 1,044 housing units.

History
Jefferson Township was organized in 1834. It is named for Thomas Jefferson, third President of the United States.

Geography

Cities, towns, villages
 Denver
 Mexico
 Peru (west edge)

Unincorporated towns
 Courter at 
 Doyle at

Extinct towns
 Stringtown

Cemeteries
The township contains these five cemeteries: Courter, Eel River Chapel, Green Lawn, Koontz and Westlawn.

Major highways
  U.S. Route 31

Airports and landing strips
 Peru Municipal Airport

School districts
 North Miami Community Schools

Political districts
 Indiana's 5th congressional district
 State House District 23
 State House District 24
 State Senate District 18

References
 
 United States Census Bureau 2008 TIGER/Line Shapefiles
 IndianaMap

External links
 Indiana Township Association
 United Township Association of Indiana
 City-Data.com page for Jefferson Township

Townships in Miami County, Indiana
Townships in Indiana